I Rock may refer to

 I Rock television show
 Independence Rock Festival in Mumbai